Oncidium longipes is a species of orchid occurring from Brazil to northeastern Argentina.

References

External links 

longipes
Orchids of Brazil
Orchids of Argentina